Uprooted is a 2015 high fantasy novel by Naomi Novik, based on Polish folklore. The story tells of a village girl, Agnieszka, who is selected by the local wizard for her unseen magical powers. Together they battle the nearby forest, the Wood, as it seeks to take over the land. The book has been warmly welcomed by critics and other fantasy authors, who have praised the portrayals of both Agnieszka and the Wood. It won the 2015 Nebula Award for Best Novel, the 2016 Locus Award for Best Fantasy Novel, and the 2016 Mythopoeic Award in the category Adult Literature. It was a finalist for the 2016 Hugo Award for Best Novel.

Book

Synopsis 

Agnieszka lives in the village of Dvernik in the kingdom of Polnya. Every ten years the local wizard ("the Dragon") collects one teenage girl as payment for protecting the local valley from the magical forest (the Wood) that borders it. Despite being born in a tribute year, Agnieszka does not fear being taken, as the Dragon only chooses the best and brightest girls and she is clumsy and slovenly – unlike her beautiful friend Kasia, who has been groomed to be selected. But the Dragon picks Agnieszka and takes her to his tower.

Through notes left by previous girls, Agnieszka gathers that her role is mostly household duties. But the reason for his choice is that she has magical abilities, and he starts teaching her simple spells. Agnieszka finds these acts of magic difficult and unnatural.

As part of his duties, the Dragon leaves to deal with a Chimera. In his absence, Agnieszka notices a call for assistance from her village. Defying the Dragon, she escapes from the tower and returns to Dvernik, where she learns that wolves from the Wood have infected the cattle and a man. She successfully uses magic to help destroy the cattle, only for the wolves to return and to try to kill her and Kasia. The Dragon arrives and saves her, but is wounded. Returning them both to the tower, Agnieszka saves his life after she intuits a spell from one of the witch Jaga's notebooks which the Dragon had thought useless. Recognizing that her powers differ from his, he reluctantly allows Agnieszka to teach herself Jaga's more intuitive magic.

Kasia is captured by creatures from the Wood. Knowing that no one returns from it alive, the Dragon writes her off as dead. Agnieszka uses her magic to locate Kasia, half-entombed in a tree that is consuming her, and to extract her. However, the Wood has corrupted Kasia, and the Dragon tells Agnieszka that her friend must be killed. He agrees to put off the execution, and Agnieszka uses a summoning spell to see if there is anything of Kasia still left in her now immensely strong tree-body. She and the Dragon combine their magic and free Kasia's mind.

News of Kasia brings Prince Marek and his wizard, the Falcon, to the Dragon's tower. Once they realize that Kasia is no longer under the Wood's spell, they order the Dragon to retrieve the Prince's mother, who ran away twenty years earlier. They and thirty soldiers go into the Wood. Walkers and Mantises slaughter the troops, but the party frees the comatose Queen. The Dragon wants to destroy the weakened Wood once and for all, but the Prince takes his mother and Kasia back to court to prove they are free of the Wood's corruption. Agnieszka goes with them to testify. She gains certification as a witch, but things quickly go awry. The Queen speaks at her trial to blame Rosya, the rival state to Polnya. A wizard is transformed into a hideous creature which kills the King before being slain. The Queen manipulates her oldest son into going to war against Rosya, where he is killed; traitor soldiers murder the Crown Prince's wife, intending to kill his children as well. Instead, Agnieszka and Kasia grab the children and flee to the Dragon's tower. The Dragon has been joined by a baron and his soldiers. The Queen, Marek, and the Falcon arrive at the Dragon's tower and fight a battle. Just before the Queen can kill her grandchildren, Agnieszka sees in a vision that the Queen is inhabited by the Wood Queen. Kasia fails to kill the Queen.

Agnieszka convinces the Dragon to help her to defeat the forest once and for all. They try to burn the heart tree in which the Wood Queen is entombed, but she defeats them and forces Agnieszka into a tree-trunk. Agnieszka has a vision of the past where the Wood Queen was part of a magical group in the forest. She married a human king, but when he died his people turned on the wood people, causing them to become trees to protect themselves. After they failed to kill the Wood Queen, she returned to her people only to find them turned into trees, and in a misguided effort to protect them, began feeding people to the trees. Agnieszka escapes  and tells the Wood Queen to heal her sister's tree with her own body. The Dragon doubts this will keep the forest in check. He goes to the Polnya court in Kralia to help free it of the corruption that has taken root there: Agnieszka suspects he is running from his feelings for her.

A year later Agnieszka has tamed the Walkers who now help her in burning corrupted trees and in planting new, good trees. At the local harvest, the Dragon returns to collect his taxes: Agnieszka knows he has returned for her.

Characters 

 Agnieszka, the protagonist
 Kasia, Agnieszka's best friend
 Prince Marek, a son of the King of Polnya
 Sarkan, "The Dragon", the wizard residing in a tower near Agnieszka's village
 Solya, "The Falcon", a wizard known for his "far sight" magic
 Alosha, "The Sword", the warrior wizard
 Father Ballo, "The Owl", the monk wizard
 Ragostok, "The Splendid", the jeweller wizard (great-grandson of Alosha)
 Queen Hanna, the Queen of Polnya, captured by the Wood 20 years ago
 The Wood, an ancient forest

Sites 

 Polnya and Rosya, two rival kingdoms
 Dvernik, the village where Agnieszka and Kasia live, near The Wood
 The Wood, a doomed forest on the border of Polnya and Rosya, full of strange creatures
 Porosna, a village lost in the wood
 Kralia, the capital of Polnya
 Dragon Tower, Sarkan's home, built over the ruins of an ancient civilization
 The Spindle, a river that flows along the valley and disappears deep into The Wood

Publication history 

Uprooted was published in 2015 by Del Rey Books in New York, and by Pan Books in London. It has been translated into Chinese, Czech, Dutch, French, Polish, Spanish, Thai, and Ukrainian. A limited edition of 750 copies, with illustrations by Donato Giancola, was published by Grim Oak Press of Seattle in 2018. The edition contains 33 full-page monochrome plates, for a frontispiece and one illustration in each chapter.

Scholarly and critical reception

Origins 

Uprooted is influenced by Polish folklore: Novik was brought up on Polish fairytales. The protagonist's name references a story, Agnieszka Skrawek Nieba (Agnieszka Piece of Sky) by the Polish children's author and translator ; Novik specially liked the story as a child. Baba Jaga is a common bogeyman in Slavic folklore, including in the Polish stories that Novik used to hear at bedtime. The "birthday song about living a hundred years", to whose melody Agnieszka chants the spell which cures the Dragon of corruption, is the Polish birthday song Sto lat, meaning literally "[May you live] one hundred years". At the final feast, Agnieszka tastes zhurek, a phonetic spelling of an Eastern European sour rye soup known in Poland as żur or żurek.

Critical reception 

The author Amal El-Mohtar, reviewing the "sword-and-sorcery fantasy novel" for NPR, described it as "moving, heartbreaking, and thoroughly satisfying". She comments that the book contains enough plot for at least three books, but manages never to feel rushed; she finds it "grounded and meticulous in its exploration of character and setting." In her view Uprooted is "a triumph on several fronts", including its pace, setting, escalating tension, and especially the strong friendship between the "uncouth, coltish" Agnieszka and her opposite, the "gorgeous, skillful, brave" Kasia. The result is a "perfectly immersive" read that takes "classic fantasy stances", like the irritable male wizard in his tower, and somehow creates a fresh and vibrant text from these ingredients.

Mac Rogers, in Slate, writes that Novik skilfully provides readers with "several modes of wish-fulfillment" through the book, including giving the protagonist Agnieska "the full Harry Potter/Katniss Everdeen experience", at once followed by a "Belle/Jane Eyre" setup in the "Dragon's" tower. Like El-Mohtar, Rogers remarks that the book contains material for a whole trilogy, wishing that Novik had given Agnieszka the chance "to explore a few blind-alley identities" on the way to becoming a "latter-day Baba Yaga".

Kate Nepveu, on Tor.com, writes that a reader of the first three chapters might expect the book to be a Beauty and the Beast tale, or a story of "intrinsically-gendered magic". Instead, it is "a kingdom-level fantasy with great magic and an engaging narrator—which packs a surprising amount of plot into its single volume." She finds the wood a "wonderful" antagonist, commenting that the book describes "a series of increasingly-intense magical struggles as the Wood’s corrupting influence escalates and diversifies." The effect is in her view exciting and suspenseful. She considers the use of standard fairy-tale elements like woods, wolves, princes, and lost queens both modern and cohesive, creating an "emotionally satisfying" novel.

Catherine Mann, for the British Fantasy Society, calls Uprooted "an inventive and very enjoyable book" which speedily immerses the reader in its world. In her view, the story starts simply but grows steadily more complex, more imaginative, and more suspenseful. Mann likens the account of Agnieszka's "instinctive magic", very different from the codified approach of the court wizards, to that described by Diana Wynne Jones, calling this "a high compliment."

Kallam Clay, in The Mercury News, writes that unlike her 8-volume Temeraire alternate history series, Uprooted is a traditional fantasy. He finds Agnieszka "a wonderful protagonist, far from perfect but tough and charming", describing Novik's handling of Agnieszka's voice as "pitch-perfect", so that her decisions emerge naturally from her character.

Genevieve Valentine, reviewing the book in The New York Times, writes that the coming-of-age tale is a "messier" story, deeper than the "bright, forthright" and somewhat mythic teenage books that it might call to mind. In her view, Novik "skillfully takes the fairy-tale-turned-bildungsroman structure of her premise" and develops it into "a very enjoyable fantasy with the air of a modern classic."

In 2015, Warner Brothers purchased the rights to make a movie adaptation of Uprooted and assigned Ellen DeGeneres to produce it.

Awards 

Uprooted won the 2015 Nebula Award for Best Novel, the 2016 Locus Award for Best Fantasy Novel, and the 2016 Mythopoeic Award in the category Adult Literature. It was also a finalist for the 2016 Hugo Award for Best Novel.

References

Sources 

 

2015 American novels
2015 fantasy novels
Novels by Naomi Novik
Slavic mythology in popular culture
Del Rey books